My Foolish Heart is a 1949 American romantic drama film  directed by Mark Robson, starring Dana Andrews and Susan Hayward. It relates the story of a woman's reflections on the bad turns her life has taken.

Adapted from J.D. Salinger's 1948 short story "Uncle Wiggily in Connecticut", this remains the only authorized film adaptation of Salinger's work; the filmmakers' infidelity to his story was responsible for precluding any other film versions of other Salinger works, including The Catcher in the Rye. The film inspired the Danish story Mit dumme hjerte by Victor Skaarup.

Plot
At the sight of one of her old dresses, a young but unhappy woman, who is about to divorce, remembers her first love. The story is then told in flashback.

In 1939 in New York City, student Eloise Winters meets Walt Dreiser at a student party. A few days later, Walt asks her to go out with him. For him, it is only an opportunity to have a good time. When Eloise realizes it, she lets him understand that she is a looking for a permanent relationship. Walt continues to chase her, and eventually both end up falling in love.

World War II breaks out and Walt joins the US Army. Before going overseas, he asks Eloise to spend a night with him. At first hesitant, she finally accepts the proposition. Realizing she is pregnant, she decides to hide her condition from Walt because she wants him to marry her only for love and not to legitimize the child.

Cast 
 Dana Andrews as Walt Dreiser
 Susan Hayward as Eloise Winters
 Kent Smith as Lewis H. Wengler
 Lois Wheeler as Mary Jane
 Jessie Royce Landis as Martha Winters
 Robert Keith as Henry Winters
 Gigi Perreau as Ramona
 Karin Booth as Miriam Ball
 Todd Karns as Miriam's Escort
 Phillip Pine as Sergeant Lucey
 Martha Mears as Nightclub Singer
 Edna Holland as Dean Whiting
 Jerry Paris as Usher
 Marietta Canty as Grace
 Barbara Woodell as Red Cross receptionist
 Regina Wallace as Mme Crandall
 Neville Brand as Football Game Spectator (uncredited) 
 Edward Peil Sr. as Conductor (uncredited)

Reception
After being disappointed, according to biographer Ian Hamilton, when "rumblings from Hollywood" over his 1943 short story "The Varioni Brothers" came to nothing, J.D. Salinger did not hesitate when independent producer Samuel Goldwyn offered to buy the film rights to "Uncle Wiggily in Connecticut". His agent Dorothy Olding later explained this uncharacteristic relinquishing of control with the simple statement that "We thought they would make a good movie".

Indeed, "a good movie" would seem to have been implied by the background of those involved in the production, which included Oscar-winning actress Teresa Wright, and Casablanca screenwriters Julius J. Epstein and Philip G. Epstein. (Some years earlier, Salinger had referenced Casablanca in his 1944 short story "Both Parties Concerned"; one of its characters, upon learning his wife has left him, re-enacts the "Play it, Sam" scene from the film with an imaginary pianist.) However, the eventual film, renamed My Foolish Heart and with Susan Hayward replacing Wright at the last minute, was critically lambasted upon its release.

The New Yorker wrote that it was "full of soap-opera clichés", and, while allowing for "some well-written patches of wryly amusing dialogue", Time rejected it as a "damp fable ... the screenplay turns on all the emotional faucets of a Woman's Home Companion serial". Goldwyn biographer A. Scott Berg explained that "in the Epsteins' version, more than had ever been suggested [in the original story] was shown, resulting in a 'four handkerchief' movie with a farfetched plot". Berg even called the film a "bastardization". Because of what Salinger's agent later called "'a terrible movie' made in the 1950s (sic)" of one of his stories, the author never again relinquished control of his work to Hollywood filmmakers despite persistent interest in a screen adaptation of The Catcher in the Rye.

Despite a critical drubbing, the film was nominated for Academy Awards for Best Actress in a Leading Role (Susan Hayward) and Best Music, Song (Victor Young and Ned Washington for the title song, sung by Martha Mears), which has become a jazz standard. The film's standing has not improved with time: in 1996 Christopher Durang called it "a soggy love story." The film critic Andrew Sarris defended the film, although he admitted that as it was his deceased brother's favorite film, so much of the movie's appeal for him was nostalgic.

References

External links 
 
 
 
 

1949 films
1949 drama films
American drama films
American black-and-white films
Films scored by Victor Young
Films based on short fiction
Films directed by Mark Robson
Films set in Connecticut
Films set in New York City
Samuel Goldwyn Productions films
J. D. Salinger
1940s English-language films
1940s American films